Patrick A. Trueman is an American attorney and anti-pornography activist serving as the current president of the National Center on Sexual Exploitation, formerly known as Morality in Media. He previously worked as the director of government affairs for the American Family Association, as a legal counsel for the Family Research Council and as the executive director of the Americans United for Life. Trueman was the Chief of the Child Exploitation and Obscenity Section, Criminal Division at the US Department of Justice from 1988 to 1993. During his tenure, the George H. W. Bush administration aggressively prosecuted obscenity cases against adult pornography. The ABA Journal dubs him a "porn war veteran".

Personal life
Trueman lives near Washington, D.C. with his wife Laura Clay and their three children.

References

Year of birth missing (living people)
Living people
American anti-abortion activists
Anti-pornography activists
United States Department of Justice lawyers